Edith Wilson ( Goodall; September 2, 1896 – March 31, 1981) was a blues singer, vaudeville performer, and actress from Louisville, Kentucky, US. An African-American who performed and recorded in the classic female blues style in the 1920s, Wilson worked in vaudeville and stage productions, first in Louisville and later throughout the US and abroad. From the 1930s onward, she acted in radio plays and television, and from 1948 to 1966 represented the Aunt Jemima brand for Quaker Oats in personal appearances and on television. She remained an active performer until 1980.

Biography

She was born Edith Goodall on September 2, 1896, in Louisville, Kentucky, to Susan Jones and Hundley Goodall.
(Her birthdate is often stated as ten years later, but this was due to vanity.)

Her first professional experience came in 1919 in Louisville's Park Theater.
The singer Lena Wilson and her brother, Danny, performed in Louisville; she joined their act.
Edith was married to Danny Wilson from 1921 until his death in 1928.

Danny, a pianist who had been trained at a conservatory in Charleston, South Carolina, encouraged Lena and Edith to sing not just blues but also other song forms. Together the trio performed on the East Coast in 1920–1921, and when they were in New York City Wilson was signed by Columbia, which recorded her in 1921 with Johnny Dunn's Jazz Hounds. She recorded 17 songs with Dunn in 1921 and 1922. In 1924 she worked with Fletcher Henderson in New York, where she was slated to sing with Coleman Hawkins, but Hawkins refused to perform because he wanted additional compensation. She remained a popular Columbia artist through 1925.

Wilson recorded far less than other female blues stars of the 1920s like Bessie Smith. After she left Columbia in 1925, she recorded one record for Brunswick in 1929 and a handful of sides for Victor in 1930. She remained a nightclub and theater singer, working for years on the New York entertainment scene. She sang with Florence Mills in the Lew Leslie Plantation Review in Harlem. She also made several trips to England, where she and Mills were well received in the long-running revue Blackbirds of 1926. She sang with The Hot Chocolates revue, performing alongside Louis Armstrong and Fats Waller, and made appearances with Bill Robinson, Duke Ellington, Alberta Hunter, Cab Calloway, and Noble Sissle.

Wilson did extensive work as an actress, appearing on radio in The Great Gildersleeve, on radio and television in Amos 'n' Andy, and on film in To Have and Have Not (1944).
She also performed with the United Service Organizations (USO) on US military bases during World War II. She met Millard Wilson, serendipitously with the same last name, and they married in 1947.

In 1948, Wilson became the face of Aunt Jemima.
She was the first Aunt Jemima to appear in television commercials.
Wilson received the Key to the City of Albion, Michigan, on January 25, 1964.
Throughout this period, the NAACP and other civil rights organizations campaigned against racist portrayals of African-American life.
Although "her appearance as Aunt Jemima on early commercials was criticized as demeaning",
she was proud of what she considered the aura of dignity she brought to the character.
Quaker Oats ended local appearances for Aunt Jemima in 1965, and ended her employment in 1966.

In 1963, Wilson became executive secretary for the Negro Actors Guild, and was involved with the National Association of Negro Musicians into the '70s.

Wilson made a comeback in 1973 to play with Eubie Blake, Little Brother Montgomery, and Terry Waldo. Her last live show was at the 1980 Newport Jazz Festival.

Wilson died in Chicago on March 31, 1981.

In 2020 the Killer Blues Headstone Project placed a headstone for Edith Wilson at Mt. Glenwood Cemetery in Thorton, IL

References

External links
 
Stuart A. Rose Manuscript, Archives, and Rare Book Library, Emory University: Edith Wilson papers, 1940-1979

1896 births
1981 deaths
American blues singers
Vaudeville performers
Musicians from Louisville, Kentucky
Actresses from Louisville, Kentucky
20th-century American actresses
20th-century American singers
Singers from Kentucky
Blues musicians from Kentucky
20th-century American women singers
Kentucky women musicians